New York's 40th State Senate district is one of 63 districts in the New York State Senate. It has been represented by Democrat Peter Harckham since 2019, following his defeat of incumbent Republican Terrence Murphy.

Geography
District 40 takes in northern Westchester County and eastern Putnam County and Dutchess County in the Hudson Valley. It includes the communities of Yorktown, Cortlandt, Somers, Peekskill, Carmel, Southeast, Patterson, Pawling, and Beekman, among others.

The district overlaps with New York's 17th, 18th, and 19th congressional districts, and with the 92nd, 93rd, 94th, 95th, and 105th districts of the New York State Assembly.

Recent election results

2020

2018

2016

2014

2012

Federal results in District 40

References

40